Mitchel Malyk (born October 7, 1995) is a Canadian luger who has competed since 2011. He competed in the first ever Youth Olympics in Innsbruck, Austria, where he finished 5th. Malyk  competed for Canada at the 2014 Winter Olympics in Sochi, Russia in the men's single competition in which he placed 26th.

References

External links

 

1995 births
Canadian male lugers
Living people
Lugers at the 2014 Winter Olympics
Lugers at the 2018 Winter Olympics
Olympic lugers of Canada
Lugers from Calgary
Lugers at the 2012 Winter Youth Olympics